Ian McAllister (born 8 February 1960) is a Scottish former professional footballer who spent his entire professional career with Ayr United, making 405 appearances in the Scottish Football League.

References

1960 births
Living people
Scottish footballers
Ayr United F.C. players
Scottish Football League players
Association football central defenders